Rustam Shah Mohmand (born 15 August 1942 in Charsadda) is a senior Pakistani diplomat, political scientist and politician.

Education 

Rustam Shah Mohmand studied civil engineering in Peshawar's College of Engineering and Technology (now University of Engineering and Technology, Peshawar) and King's College London. He graduated with a degree in the humanities from the University of Peshawar and then joined the civil service of Pakistan.

Diplomat 

He specializes in FATA and refugee affairs. He has served as Chief Secretary NWFP, Interior Secretary of Pakistan, Pakistan's Ambassador to Afghanistan and Commissioner for Afghan Refugees. Mohmand also served as Political Agent in the Khyber and South Waziristan Agencies.

As part of his work in South Waziristan, Mohmand helped rebuild the main bazaar in Wana, the winter capital, which was later named "Rustam bazar" by the local maliks (or tribal chiefs) to honour him. From 1987 to 1989, he worked as Chief Commissioner for Afghan Refugees. He is currently a leader of Pakistan Tehreek-e-Insaf and a member of the Khyber Pakhtunkhwa Advisory committee (headed by Imran Khan), which advises the provincial government on development and planning.

See also

Imran Khan

References

External links 
 PTI OFFICIAL WEBSITE

Pakistan Tehreek-e-Insaf politicians
Pashtun people
Ambassadors of Pakistan to Afghanistan
People from Peshawar
University of Engineering & Technology, Peshawar alumni
1942 births
Living people
Chief Secretaries of Khyber Pakhtunkhwa